E. walkeri may refer to:
 Elenchus walkeri, a synonym for Elenchus tenuicornis, an insect species
 Eleutherodactylus walkeri, a frog species endemic to Ecuador

See also